Dalida internationale is the eighth album by Dalida, released in 1961. Several of the singles were hits.

Track listing 
Barclay – 80144 Ⓜ, 065 521-0:

References

Sources 

1961 albums
Dalida albums
French-language albums
Barclay (record label) albums